Patrick Damian Webber (born 15 May 1999) is an English professional footballer who plays as a defender. He most recently played for Wigan Athletic.

Club career

Ipswich Town
Webber joined Ipswich from Worthing on a trial in February 2016, before he rejoined Town in July 2016, becoming a full academy player, signing a two-year scholarship. He went on to make his full senior debut in the 2–1 defeat against Crystal Palace in the EFL Cup second round on 22 August 2017.

Braintree Town (loans)
On 2 February 2018, Webber joined National League South side Braintree Town on a one-month loan deal.

On 2 August 2018, Webber returned to Braintree, following their promotion to the National League on a short-term loan deal until December 2018.

Wigan Athletic
On 12 August 2019, Webber signed for Wigan Athletic on a two-year deal, following a trial the previous season. On 18 January 2021, Webber left Wigan Athletic after his contract was cancelled by mutual consent.

Personal life
Patrick is the son of former Millwall defender Damien Webber.

Career statistics

References

External links

1999 births
Living people
Sportspeople from Worthing
English footballers
Association football defenders
Worthing F.C. players
Ipswich Town F.C. players
Braintree Town F.C. players
Wigan Athletic F.C. players
National League (English football) players